Whole Women's Health may refer to:

 Whole Woman's Health v. Hellerstedt, US Supreme Court decision that Texas cannot place restrictions on the delivery of abortion services that create an undue burden for women seeking an abortion
 Whole Woman's Health v. Jackson, US Supreme Court decision that abortion providers could not sue state-court judges, court clerks, or the state's Attorney General in an effort to stop the filing of private civil-enforcement lawsuits, but abortion providers' claims against state licensing officials could proceed past the motion-to-dismiss stage